Ron Thaler is a record producer, touring and session drummer, and 360 immersive sound entrepreneur.

Thaler is active in music licensing and publishing through his firms RTP Music Ltd. (Canada) and Soda Box Music (New York City and Florence). He is the CEO of Soundsphere Studios, a spatial sound studio.

Biography

Early years 

Thaler was 11 years old when he first picked up drumsticks, after playing piano for three years. He joined his high school jazz-band and played his first professional shows at age 16 with jazz saxophonist Gordon Clements and with the Island Big Band. In his late teens, Thaler moved to Vancouver, Canada, and toured with electronica band Moev in support of their release Yeah Whatever (Nettwerk Records).  Thaler performed with trumpeter Mark Hasselbach (Smooth), and trombonist Ian McDougall (Concord).In 1993, Thaler began recording at Envy Music House and Ludlow Productions on music jingles for the Cartoon Network, Coca-Cola, McDonald's and ESPN, and performed in Latin-jazz group Conosur along with Manolo Badrena and Al Di Meola, and with soukous artist Dominic Kanza.  In 1994 Thaler recorded the East Coast sessions for Arista Records artist Jonathan Robbins' album "You Got Me", tracking drums on the West Coast sessions. Thaler recorded drumset and percussion on the title track.

In 2011, Thaler toured the US with Anita Prime.

 Producer 

In 2010, Thaler produced Anita Prime's Destiny album. The next year he produced Anita Prime's single "Complicated" reaching number 33 on Billboard Dance Club chart in November 2011.

 Solo projects 
In 1994 Thaler began performing under his own name, showcasing his original compositions, and he recorded ...Works (TP Records/OMD) with jazz musicians Ray Anderson, Hiram Bullock, Rick Margitza, Rufus Reid, Adam Rogers, and Oskar Cartaya. The group performed at the Montreal Jazz Festival, the Vancouver Jazz Fest, the Zebrock Festival, and other venues in Canada and France.

In 1997 Thaler formed "The True Story Band", with jazz musicians Mike Stern, Chris Clark, Ron Bertolet and Jeff Carney. Thaler toured "The True Story Band" through Europe, Canada and the US in support of the group's two releases, 1997's Medium Rare Grounds (TP/Factor) and 1998's Grain (EFA/JVC).

In 2000 Thaler took to reworking the music of Led Zeppelin for an instrumental context. Thaler recorded Jazzed & Confused: The Led Zep Project (TP) in 2001. The album includes Led Zeppelin compositions "Kashmir", "Whole Lotta Love", "The Rain Song", "The Ocean", and "Dazed & Confused", and 25 musicians including guitarists Mike Stern and Dweezil Zappa, violinist Miri Ben Ari, turntablist DJ Logic, harmonica player Hendrik Meurkens, trombonist Dave Panichi, trumpeter Vinny Cutro, and flamenco vocalist and dancers Amparo and Racquel Heredia. The album was produced by Thaler and Goo Goo Dolls/Maroon 5 alumnus Michael Landolt.

In 2008, Thaler formed the experimental music group Elimotion, with bassist Matt Garrison, turntablist DJ Logic and guitarist Elijah Steele. The group's first release, Elimotion 1, was recorded at Manhattan Center Studios NYC, and released in 2014.

 Seminars 

Thaler has delivered many drumming clinics, seminars and educational workshops internationally. He has performed at the 1996 Montreal DrumFest, the 2003 TUDW Ultimate Drummers Weekend International Drum Festival (Australia), the 2004 KOSA Drum Festival (solo performance and trio performance with drummers Johnny Rabb and Steve Smith), the 2006 Fort Myers Drum Festival, the inaugural 2010 Victoria Drum Fest, the 2010 National Association of Music Manufacturers (NAMM) International Music Fair, the MIDEM Music Conference in Cannes France, the 2011 CMW Music Conference in Toronto Canada, the 1998 Music West International Music Conference in Vancouver, the 2004 Paris Zebrock Music Festival, at Drummer's Collective New York City, Music Academy International (France), University of Victoria, University of British Columbia, Music Arts Academy (Geneva, Switzerland), SAE College (Auckland New Zealand, Barcelona Spain), Prime Music Academy (Wellington, New Zealand), and others. Thaler has been featured on Drumeo TV, and on four segments for the Daddario/Evans Educational Webcast Series.

In 1998, Thaler released an instructional drumming video called Phraseology And Individuality On The Drumset.  The video was voted one of the "Top 25 Must-Have Instructional Drumming Videos of All Time" by readers of France's Batteur Magazine'' in 2007.

References

External links 

 Ron Thaler website

Year of birth missing (living people)
Living people
Canadian male drummers
Jazz fusion musicians